The Santana 21 is an American trailerable sailboat that was designed by Seymour Paul as a lightweight racer-cruiser and first built in 1969.

Production
The design was built by W. D. Schock Corp in the United States between 1969 and 1976, with 879 boats completed, but it is now out of production.

Design
The Santana 21 is a recreational keelboat, built predominantly of fiberglass, with wood trim. It has a fractional sloop rig, a raked stem, a nearly-plumb transom, a transom-hung rudder controlled by a tiller and a stub keel with a swing keel. It displaces  and carries  of iron ballast.

The boat is normally fitted with a small  outboard motor for docking and maneuvering.

The design has sleeping accommodation for four people, with a double "V"-berth in the bow cabin and two straight settee berths in the main cabin. The head is located just aft of the bow cabin on the port side.

For sailing downwind the design may be equipped with a symmetrical or an asymmetrical spinnaker.

Operational history
In a 2010 review Steve Henkel wrote, "...the Santana 21 was conceived as a lightweight racer-cruiser, with the emphasis on racing, In fact, with a D/L ratio of 86, she is technically classified as an ultralight. Her major distinction is her unique 550-pound hinged cast-iron keel, mounted in a one-foot-deep fixed stub keel. The swinging part reaches five feet below the waterline in the down position, providing considerable righting moment. The swing-keel trunk has a massive cast-iron hinge weighing approximately 100 pounds, which is said in the builder's literature to give the swinging part 'superior lateral support and protects it during beaching manuevers.' Best features: She looks fast to us ... Worst features: The rudder is detachable but not hinged, limiting navigation to waters deeper than three feet (or slightly less in absolutely calm protected water) despite the announced eighteen inch minimum draft. The depth of the keel is controlled by a winch mounted down below, just forward of the mast (see inboard profile), not easy to get to in an emergency. With 3' 10" headroom, cruising of any significant duration would best be done by shorter than average sailors or those with flexible backs."

A review in Sailrite reported, "the Santana 21 performs well in most conditions and is very fun to sail. The Santana 21 has reasonable accommodations for a 21 footer."

See also
List of sailing boat types

References

External links

Keelboats
1960s sailboat type designs
Sailing yachts
Trailer sailers
Sailboat type designs by Seymour Paul
Sailboat types built by W. D. Schock Corp